Aḥwash (Neo-Tifinagh: , IPA /æħwæʃ/, also Romanized as  or ) is a Shilha style of collective performance, including dance, singing, poetry and percussion, from southern Morocco. The ahwash is performed on the occasion of local festivals as a celebration of the community.

Description 
The ahwash is usually performed by two large groups of people, typically men and women on opposite sides, who alternate their performances of song, dance, poetry, and drumming on frame drums. The ahwash is rarely performed outside of individual villages, because of the difficulty of transporting the large number of participants (often more than twenty, and sometimes 150 or more). As a result, the ahwash has developed somewhat independently among different villages, and the details of the performances differ.

History
Ahwash may have come from Telouet , though historians have struggled to conclusively determine its origins, because of the lack of written history. Some believe the dance migrated along with the tribes and villages in the area. The dance is now found throughout the High Atlas and Sous regions.

Religion and spirituality 
The ahwash is recognized by many Moroccans to involve some pre-Islamic components of traditional Berber religion. While the poetry may make reference to Islamic traditions, the communal form of dancing and singing, involving members of the community of both sexes, stands in contrast to conservative Islamic views. In most places, an ahwash is performed in front of a saint's tomb during religious holidays, called moussem. In some instances, it is disallowed for fear of offending the saint, or for fear of the combination of the saint's power and the power of the ahwash. Very religious Moroccans may choose not to take part in the ahwash, because they believe the devil is a part of the performance.

The celebration of an ahwash is both an important communal and spiritual practice, sometimes leading to a supernatural experience; there are many stories from southern Moroccan villages of performers who are clairvoyant.

Gallery

References 

Moroccan styles of music
Berber music